Statistics of Kuwaiti Premier League in the 1974–75 season.

Overview
Al Qadisiya Kuwait won the championship.

References
RSSSF

1974–75
1974–75 in Asian association football leagues
football